Jeffrey Carl Backus (born September 21, 1977) is a former American football offensive tackle in the National Football League (NFL). He played college football for the University of Michigan. He was drafted with the 18th pick in the first round of the 2001 NFL Draft by the Detroit Lions and played his entire 12-year career for the team.

High school career
Backus attended Norcross High School and was a standout in football and baseball. He spent his freshman year at Marist School in Dunwoody before returning to Norcross, where he played his middle school years. In football, as a senior, he was a USA Today All-America selection, and was chosen by the Gwinnett Touchdown Club as the Gwinnett Touchdown Club's Lineman of the Year.

Professional career

In July 2001, Jeff Backus signed a $7 million 5-year contract with the Lions, including a $3.2 million signing bonus. In July 2006, Jeff Backus signed a $40 million 6-year contract with the Lions. On November 22, 2012, Backus' streak of starting and playing in 186 consecutive games ended due to injury. On March 14, 2013, Backus retired.

Post-playing career
Backus became a part-time coaching intern with the Detroit Lions after his retirement from playing football.

References

External links
 

1977 births
Living people
American people of Lithuanian descent
People from Norcross, Georgia
Sportspeople from the Atlanta metropolitan area
Sportspeople from Midland, Michigan
Players of American football from Georgia (U.S. state)
Players of American football from Michigan
American football offensive tackles
Norcross High School alumni
Michigan Wolverines football players
Detroit Lions players
Ed Block Courage Award recipients